Beate Schmeichel-Falkenberg, real name Beate Hartung (20 June 1926 – 17 September 2017) was a German teacher and author.

Life 
Born in Hamm, Schmeichel-Falkenberg studied German and English at the University of Göttingen and then worked as a journalist for the BBC in England. Later she returned to Münster and worked as a teacher. With her second husband Manfred Schmeichel, she founded a special education school in Mössingen, which is part of today's .<ref>[http://www.taz.de/1/archiv/digitaz/artikel/?ressort=tz&dig=2012%2F06%2F16%2Fa0017&cHash=b2ef96fe8f "I like to start something new." Beate Schmeichel-Falkenberg.] In TAZ, 16 June 2012</ref>

Schmeichel-Falkenberg worked for some time at Westdeutscher Rundfunk as a presenter in the programme  and at the University of Münster at the Institutum Judaicum.

In the "Society for Exile Research" she headed the working group "Women in Exile".

Schmeickel-Falkenberg lived in Mössingen where she died at the age of 91 and
 was buried in the local cemetery.

 Publications 
 with Siglinde Bolbecher and the : Frauen im Exil, Tagungsband, Klagenfurt : Drava, 2007
 with Ursula Wiedenmann: Grenzen überschreiten : Frauen, Kunst und Exil, Tagungsband, Würzburg : Königshausen & Neumann, 2005
 with Simone Barck and Anneke de Rudder: Jahrhundertschicksale. Frauen im sowjetischen Exil.Lukas, Berlin 2003.
 with Inge Hansen-Schaberg: Frauen erinnern : Widerstand, Verfolgung, Exil, 1933-1945, Tagungsband, Berlin : Weidler, 2000
 with Manfred Schmeichel: Hilfe für körperbehinderte Kinder, Stuttgart : Klett-Cotta 1978

 References 

 External links 
 
 Obituary, in the Schwäbisches Tagblatt'', 23 September 2017
 Obituary, exilforschung.de

German women writers
German journalists
1926 births
2017 deaths
People from Hamm